The German torpedo boat T15 was one of nine Type 37 torpedo boats built for the Kriegsmarine (German Navy) during World War II. Completed in mid-1941, the ship was transferred to Occupied France in December. She helped to escort a pair of battleships and a heavy cruiser through the English Channel back to Germany in February 1942 in the Channel Dash and then was ordered to Norway for escort work. T15 returned to Germany in August where she was assigned to the Torpedo School and U-boat Flotillas as a training ship. The ship was sunk by American bombers in December 1943.

Design and description
The Type 37 torpedo boat was a slightly improved version of the preceding Type 35 with better range. Their crew numbered 119 officers and sailors.

As built, the Type 37 class mounted a single  SK C/32 gun on the stern. Anti-aircraft defense was provided by a single  SK C/30 anti-aircraft gun superfiring over the 10.5 cm gun and a pair of  C/30 guns on the bridge wings. They carried six above-water  torpedo tubes in two triple mounts and could also carry 30 mines (or 60 if the weather was good).

Modifications
Early-war modifications to the Type 37s were limited to the conversion of the foremast into a tripod mast, installation of a FuM 28 radar with fixed antennas angled 45° to each side and a 2 cm gun superfiring over the main gun. Ships participating in the Channel Dash in February 1942 were ordered to have their aft torpedo tube mount replaced by a quadruple 2 cm gun mount, but it is not certain if this was actually done. Confirmed deliveries of this mount began in May when they were installed in the superfiring position, but T15s anti-aircraft suite is unknown when she was sunk at the end of 1943.

Construction and career
T15 was ordered on 18 September 1937 from Schichau, laid down at their  Elbing, East Prussia, shipyard on 3 January 1939 as yard number 1403, launched on 16 September 1939 and commissioned on 26 June 1941; construction was delayed by shortages of skilled labor and of raw materials. Working up until December, she was then transferred to France. The following month, T15, T16, and T17 were transferred to Norway where they formed part of the escort of the heavy cruiser  to Trondheim on 19–21 March. T15 helped to escort the heavy cruiser Lützow from Kristiansand to Trondheim on 18–20 May. During the beginning stages of Operation Rösselsprung, T15 and the torpedo boat  were among the escorts for the battleship  and Admiral Hipper as they sailed from Trondheim to Altafjord in early July.

Returning to Germany in August, T15 was briefly assigned to the Torpedo School as a training ship in October before beginning a refit in October at the Oderwerke shipyard in Stettin that lasted until February 1943. She briefly rejoined the Torpedo School in April before beginning another refit in July–August. Following its completion, the boat was assigned to U-boat flotillas in the Baltic as a training ship. T15 was sunk by American bombers in Kiel on 13 December.

Notes

Citations

References

External links
Type 37 on German Navy.de

Type 37 torpedo boats
1939 ships